Poisoned Paradise: The Forbidden Story of Monte Carlo is a 1924 American silent romantic drama film directed by Louis Gasnier and starring Kenneth Harlan and Clara Bow. B. P. Schulberg, Bow's new mentor at the time, produced the picture.

Plot
As described in a film magazine review, Margot Le Blanc, left a small fortune by her foster mother, goes to Monte Carlo and loses it all gambling. When she is falling into the hands of a scheming thief, she meets Hugh Kildair, an artist that lives in the same house. After hearing her story, he suggests that she become his housekeeper under an arrangement where they shall live together as brother and sister, to which she agrees. Later, Hugh falls into a trap set by a gang of thieves involving their accomplice Mrs. Belmire. The aim of the gang is to force Hugh to reveal a cipher system entrusted to him by old Professor Durand. The plans of the gang are foiled by the arrival of the police. This experience has opened Hugh's eyes to the fact that he loves Margot, who has loved him all along. They are married without delay and return home this time as husband and wife.

Cast

Preservation
A print of Poisoned Paradise is held in the UCLA Film and Television Archive.

References

External links

Lobby posters: #1, #2, #3
Robert W. Service, Poisoned Paradise; a Romance of Monte Carlo, New York : A. L. Burt Co., 1922 (1924 photoplay edition)

1924 films
American silent feature films
Films produced by B. P. Schulberg
Films directed by Louis J. Gasnier
Films based on Canadian novels
American black-and-white films
1924 romantic drama films
Films based on works by Robert W. Service
American romantic drama films
Preferred Pictures films
1920s English-language films
Silent romantic drama films
1920s American films
Silent American drama films